Raja Rai Bahadur Thakur Jaiswal was an Indian landlord raja and businessman from the royal family Jamalpur. He was a nationalist who contributed in the freedom movement.

Personal life 
The known family lineage began in the 13th century. He migrated to Ranchi from Uttar Pradesh. He finished his education from Allahabad University earning a gold medal. His son Rai Sahib Laxminarayan grew the business, which allowed him, in 1922, to become the first Indian to own a Ford car that carried Mahatma Gandhi from Ranchi to Ramgarh for the Ramgarh Cong.ress convention in 1940. It later conveyed Indian Presidents Rajendra Prasad and Zakir Hussain. Friends continue to use it for marriage processions.

Rai Sahib's son Sheo Narain Jaiswal was chairman of Ranchi municipality (1962–76). Family member Rajaram Shastri was awarded by Padma Vibhusan and was a Member of Parliament from Varanasi. Great grandson of Rai Sahib served as State President of Jharkhand Pradesh Professionals Congress and state secretary in Jharkhand Indian National Congress and as President of social organization Empower Jharkhand which works to help the underprivileged.

Career 
He was given various names out of respect including "shellac king of Bihar, Uttar Pradesh and Madhya Pradesh". He contributed towards the freedom movement by donating money. He donated lands to tribal people. Shri Rai Sahib turned down the title of Raja Saheb by the British government following Gandhiji’s advice in 1938. Shri Rai Bahadur was an industrial advisor to the government before independence.

The Jaiswal family is a traditional Congress supporter. Many family ancestors were leaders of the party.

In 18th century, the British government identified the potential of Madhuca longifolia and helped the Jaiswal family to open Ranchi distillery, the first in India, in 1875.

References

Sources 

People from Ranchi